De Keyser is a Dutch surname mostly found in Flanders. Among variant forms are de Keijser, de Keijzer, De Keyzer, Dekeijser, DeKeyser, Dekeyser and Dekeyzer. It translates to "the emperor". People with this name include:

Alexei de Keyser (1967–2004), British television producer
David de Keyser (1927–2021), British actor
 (1823–1897), Belgian architect
Eugénie De Keyser (1918–2012), Belgian art historian
Ethel de Keyser (1926–2004), South African anti-apartheid activist
Harry de Keijser (1900–1995), Dutch pole vaulter and decathlete
Hendrick de Keyser (1565–1621), Dutch sculptor and architect
Jean-Pierre de Keyser, (born 1965) German footballer
Marie De Keyser (1815–1879), Belgian genre and history painter
Merten de Keyser (died 1536) French painter and publisher working in Antwerp
Nicaise de Keyser (1813–1873), Belgian painter
Paul De Keyser (born 1957), Belgian racing cyclist
Pieter de Keyser (1595–1676), Dutch architect and sculptor, son of Hendrick
Polydore de Keyser (1832–1918), British lawyer
Raoul De Keyser (1930–2012), Belgian painter
Thomas de Keyser (1596–1667), Dutch painter and architect, son of Hendrick
Véronique De Keyser (born 1945), Belgian politician
Willem de Keyser (architect) (1603-after 1674), Dutch architect and painter, son of Hendrick
Willem de Keyser (painter) (1647–1692), Flemish painter
De Keyzer
Bruno de Keyzer (1949–2019), French cinematographer
Carl De Keyzer (born 1958),  Belgian photographer
 (born 1958), Belgian sculptor
Gerd de Keijzer (born 1992), Dutch racing cyclist
Jack de Keyzer (born 1955), British-born Canadian blues musician
Peter De Keyzer (born 1975), Belgian economist
Concatenated:
André Dekeijser (1924–2013), Belgian contemporary sculptor
Carole Dekeijser (1959–2008), Belgian illustrator, painter and philosopher
Danny DeKeyser (born 1990), American ice hockey player
Dawn DeKeyser, American television writer and producer
Giovanni Dekeyser (born 1976), Belgian field hockey player
Jérôme Dekeyser (born 1983), Belgian field hockey player
 (1914-1984), French zoologist 
Dekeyser's nectar bat, South American bat named after him
Robert Dekeyser (born 1964), Belgian-German entrepreneur
Roger Dekeyzer (1906–1992), Belgian syndicalist and politician
Rudy Dekeyser (born 1976), Belgian molecular biologist and businessman
Tracey DeKeyser (born 1990), American ice hockey player and coach

See also
Keyser (disambiguation)
Keijzer
Keizer (surname)
De Keyser's Royal Hotel

References

Dutch-language surnames
Surnames of Belgian origin